Christopher Josif Hagi Gligor (born 8 April 1995) is an Australian football (soccer) central midfielder player who currently plays for Sydney Olympic.

Early life 
He is the son of former Romanian footballer, Tiberiu Gligor, who emigrated to Australia in the early 1990s. Gligor is also half-Filipino on his mother's side. He is named after the great former Romanian international Gheorghe Hagi.

Club career

Sydney FC
As an integral part of Sydney FC's youth team, Gligor featured prominently for two seasons which prompted the club to sign him to his first senior deal at the end of the 2011–12 A-League season. The promising young midfielder signed a two-year deal with Sydney FC along with fellow youth players Mitchell Mallia and Daniel Petkovski. In May 2012, Gligor also won player of the month and received a nomination for National Youth League Player of the Year.

After many standout performances in the National Youth League, he made his first senior league appearance at just 17 years of age as a substitute on 3 November 2012 away to Central Coast Mariners.

On 3 June 2015, Hagi, along with several other players were released from Sydney FC.

Perth Glory
On 3 July 2015 Gligor signed a contract with Perth Glory.

International career
Gligor was a member of Australia's squad at the 2013 FIFA U-20 World Cup, but did not appear in a match. He was named in the Australia squad for the 2014 AFC U-19 Championship held in Myanmar, where he featured in all 3 group games.

Career statistics

References

External links
 

1995 births
Living people
Association football midfielders
Australia youth international soccer players
Australia under-20 international soccer players
Australian soccer players
Australian people of Filipino descent
Australian people of Romanian descent
Sydney FC players
Perth Glory FC players
A-League Men players